Onur Şengül (born July 10, 1979) is a Turkish bass player who is mostly known for the acts for blues and rock scene.

He started his career with gigs with Yavuz Cetin in 1999.

He was sponsored by Yapı Kredi Kültür Sanat between 2002–2005, giving more than 300 concerts around Turkey with his blues band electric blue.

After spending nearly 6 years playing in various famous local bands and instructing bass lessons in Istanbul, he joined band for Hayko Cepkin in 2005. He was endorsed by Reebok.

He was awarded with Hayko Cepkin as "Best Rock" by Kral TV in 2006.

See also
Hayko Cepkin
Yavuz Cetin

External links
Wikipedia Turkey

Turkish bass guitarists
1979 births
Living people
21st-century bass guitarists